Siopao, is a Philippine steamed bun with various fillings. It is the indigenized version of the Fujianese baozi, introduced to the Philippines by Hokkien immigrants during the Spanish colonial period. It is a popular snack in the Philippines and is commonly sold by bakeries and restaurants.

Description
Siopao is derived from the baozi, introduced by Hokkien Chinese immigrants to the Philippines during the Spanish colonial period. The name is derived from Philippine Hokkien sio-pau. Historically, the most popular siopao buns in Manila were the ones made by restaurateur Ma Mon Luk at the turn of the 20th century.

Siopao differs from the baozi in that it is much larger and is eaten held in the hands like a sandwich. It also uses different traditional fillings. The most common fillings are pork asado (indigenized braised version of the Cantonese char siu) and bola-bola (literally "meatball", a combination of pork, chicken, beef, shrimp or salted duck egg). Siopao uses leavened wheat flour and is traditionally steamed, but a baked version (also called "toasted siopao") can be baked directly in ovens without steaming. A popular variant called "fried siopao" fries the bottom of the siopao in a greased skillet after steaming. Another dish that evolved from the siopao is the asado roll, which uses regular bread dough and is baked. 

Traditional siopao is also typically accompanied with a sweet and sour "siopao sauce" (made from cornstarch, soy sauce, sugar, garlic, and other ingredients), which is injected or spread unto the filling before eating. Plain ketchup (either tomato ketchup or banana ketchup) is also used in the same way. In contrast to the baozi which is eaten dipped in a soy sauce or vinegar mixture.

A unique variant from Siargao Island is the paowaw, a dessert bun which has a filling of bukayo (sweetened shredded coconut meat).

In other countries
Siopao was also introduced to Guam (then a part of the Philippines), with the same name. From there it has spread further into the Marshall Islands, where it is known as siu pao.

Similar dishes

There is a similar dish in Thai cuisine called salapao, which is sometimes made with a sweet filling for a dessert. Similar buns have also been introduced in Hawaii where it is called manapua, and in Samoa and the American Samoa, where it is called keke pua'a.

In popular culture
There is an urban legend about the snack alleging that cat meat is used in the production of siopao. According to historians, this story could have came from a certain sentiment towards the Chinese Filipino community or it was theorized that it could have been a smear campaign by competitors or illegitimate children from a Chinese family which runs a siopao business.

See also
 Asado roll
 Cha siu bao
 Bāozi, the Chinese version of the steamed bun.
 Ma Mon Luk
 List of buns
 List of steamed foods

References

Dumplings
Steamed buns
Philippine fusion cuisine
Stuffed dishes
Chinese fusion cuisine